Corvington is a surname. Notable people with the surname include:

André Corvington (1877–1918), Haitian fencer
Georges Corvington (1926–2013), Haitian historian

See also
Covington (surname)